The International Racquetball Federation's 18th Racquetball World Championships were held in Cali, Colombia, from July 15 to 23, 2016. This was the first time Worlds were in Colombia, and the first time the event was held in South America since 1998, when Cochabamba, Bolivia, was host.

In the final, Americans Aimee Ruiz and Janel Tisinger upset Mexicans Paola Longoria and Samantha Salas, who were the three time defending champions in women's doubles. Ruiz and Tisinger were silver medalists in 2014, when they lost to the Mexicans in the final. The win was Ruiz's third World Championship in women's doubles, as she also won in 2006 with Laura Fenton and 2008 with Jackie Paraiso. It was Tisinger's first World Championship.

Tournament format
The 2016 World Championships was a two-stage competition. There was an initial group stage played as a round robin with the results used to seed teams for the medal  round.

Round robin
Source

Pool A

Pool B

Pool C

Pool D

Elimination round
Source

References

2016 Racquetball World Championships